Ypthima watsoni, the looped three-ring, is a species of Satyrinae butterfly.

References

Fauna of India
watsoni
Butterflies described in 1893